The Monroe County Courthouse in Sparta, Wisconsin is a historic courthouse built in 1895, designed by architect Mifflin E. Bell.  It was listed on the National Register of Historic Places in 1982.

It is Richardsonian Romanesque in style.

It is a three-story red sandstone building with a hipped roof attic.

References

External links

Courthouses in Wisconsin
National Register of Historic Places in Monroe County, Wisconsin
Romanesque Revival architecture in Wisconsin
Government buildings completed in 1895
1895 establishments in Wisconsin